Chah Mirza may refer to:
 Chah Mirza Bala
 Chah Mirza Pain